Aframomum geocarpum is a species in the ginger family, Zingiberaceae. It was first described by John Michael Lock and J.B. Hall.

Range
Aframomum geocarpum is native to West Africa, from Sierra Leone to Ghana.

References 

geocarpum